The Shadow of the Cat is a 1961 British horror film directed by John Gilling for Hammer Film Productions. It stars André Morell and Barbara Shelley. It was photographed in black-and-white by Arthur Grant. It was released in May 1961 on a double feature bill with Curse of the Werewolf.

The story is about Tabitha, the house cat of a wealthy lady, who witnesses the murder of her owner by her owner's husband and two servants.  The cat becomes bent on revenge while the murderers try to kill her, the only witness.

Plot
Late at night in early 1900s England, wealthy and elderly Ella Venable is murdered in her manor house by Andrew the butler, and her body is buried on the grounds of the estate by Andrew in collusion with Ella's husband, Walter Venable, and Clara the maid.

Tabitha, Ella's tabby cat, is the only witness to the murder and burial, and instinctively understands that her mistress’s death was a crime. The murderers realize the cat's comprehension and resolve to kill her.

Before he had her killed, Walter forced Ella to sign a will that left everything to him. However, her original will — which left Walter nothing — remains hidden in the attic. Walter needs to find and destroy this original to ensure his inheritance.

Inspector Rowles and newspaper man Michael Latimer are called to the house to investigate what Walter maintains is Ella's "disappearance."

Walter invites Ella's favorite niece, Elizabeth "Beth" Venable, to stay at the house. He worries that she might question the illegitimate will and wants to "deal with her" in person.

Beth and Michael are old friends from when she used to live with her Aunt Ella, and as the story progresses they become increasingly close.

While searching for the will, Walter has an accident in the structurally unsound attic, followed by an encounter with Tabitha which causes him to have a heart attack. Bedridden and unable to continue the search for the will, he invites his criminal nephew, Jacob Venable; Jacob's father, Edgar Venable who is Walter's brother; and Jacob's wife, Louise Venable, to the house. He promises them a share of Ella's money if they find her original will and kill Tabitha. The cat witnesses their conspiracy.

There are several unsuccessful attempts to capture and kill Tabitha. One such attempt results in Andrew and Clara's deaths by cat-related accidents.

Based on Tabitha's behavior and other clues, Beth, Michael and Inspector Rowles correctly suspect Ella's murder but have no firm supporting evidence.

Jacob continues to search the attic for Ella's will but, fearing "too much depends on Walter," turns on his uncle. He lets Tabitha into Walter's bedroom. When Walter sees the cat, he has a second, fatal heart attack. His will leaves everything to Edgar.

Beth, Michael and Inspector Rowles accuse the remaining villains of conspiracy but without the original will they have no proof. Edgar, now owner of the manor, orders them out of the house. As they're leaving, Jacob sees Tabitha and pursues the cat onto the roof with everyone watching.

Edgar uses the distraction to go to the attic and continue searching for the will.

Jacob slips off the roof and falls to his death.

Edgar finds the original will hidden in the attic wall behind a painting of Tabitha. Then the cat herself appears and Edgar tries frantically to kill her. His efforts wreck the attic and he is struck and killed by a falling beam.

Tabitha leads the police to Ella's body.

The original will leaves everything to Beth but she tells Michael that she never wants to see the house again and asks him to take her away.

The house is sold and Tabitha watches from the courtyard as a new family — husband, wife, daughter and grandfather — move in. The grandfather complains that he'll probably die of boredom living there, while the husband and wife talk of convincing the old man to change his will.

Cast
 André Morell as Walter Venable 
 Barbara Shelley as Beth Venable
 William Lucas as Jacob Venable 
 Freda Jackson as Clara, the maid
 Conrad Phillips as Michael Latimer
 Richard Warner as Edgar Venable 
 Vanda Godsell as Louise Venable 
 Alan Wheatley as Inspector Rowles 
 Andrew Crawford as Andrew, the butler
 Kynaston Reeves as The Grandfather (new family)
 Catherine Lacey as Ella Venable 
 Henry Kendall as The Doctor
 Bunkie as Tabitha (uncredited) IMDB

References

External links

1961 films
Films about cats
Hammer Film Productions horror films
British black-and-white films
1961 horror films
Films directed by John Gilling
Universal Pictures films
Films scored by Mikis Theodorakis
Films set in country houses
Films shot at Bray Studios
1960s historical horror films
British historical horror films
Films set in the 1900s
1960s English-language films
1960s British films